Keycode or may refer to:

 Scancode, the sequence of data generated when pressing a key on a computer keyboard
 Keykode, an Eastman Kodak's a bar coding placed at regular intervals on negative films
 Keycode, for a lock